Open drawers  are undergarments where the backs and front of the legs are not joined together.  They were split in the middle to make it easier to urinate. As chemises decreased in length open drawers stopped being used. Elizabeth Rosevear writes:

Open Drawers. -- Girls generally begin to wear open drawers when they are about nine or ten years old. Open drawers are not cut down at the hips, and the band is made all in one piece of the material. The backs and fronts of the legs are not joined together, but hemmed separately, or lined with false hems. The fronts, in children's sizes, are seamed together for about 2 inches, in women's sizes a little more. A button and buttonhole are placed at the ends of the bands, or two tape strings. The legs may be constructed as for closed drawers, i.e. as knickerbockers with bands, or they may be made up with a deep hem, and narrow tucks above. The drawers are gathered or pleated into the bands at the waist and legs. Women's drawers are very seldom made up as closed, but nearly always as open.

Controversy

In the late 19th century, there was discussion over whether or not women should wear open drawers. Dr. E. R. Palmer writes:

I saw in a paper the other day that ladies in a Canadian city had a grand convention, and had celebrated their magnificent resolve by building in a public square a bonfire, being fed by the corsets they had been wearing. It was a revival of the old tirade against the corset. I have not forgotten what Thomas said, that women should burn their open drawers instead of their corsets. The idea of a beautifully dressed woman with trail sweeping the streets! The idea of that mode of dress being countenanced by the profession!

While the profession are warring against corsets, is it not ridiculous, not to say criminal, for us to take the position that the corset is harmful and the open drawers is not? The knights of old used to protect the genital organs of their wives from receiving germs during the day when they had gone to business. If it is gonorrhea, it is due to external infection, and I hold that infection takes place as frequently in this as in any other way on account of the delicate organ being unprotected.

while E. R. Shepherd wrote:

Many physicians oppose the wearing of closed drawers by women. In bad cases of leucorrhoea the odor arising from the discharged confined from the air in this way becomes extremely offensive to the patient at least, and may extend beyond the confines of the dress, and when she comes near the stove or register, if at no other time, to be detected by the bystanders. A free circulation of air by open drawers is wholesome to the parts, as well as a deodorizer. It is well enough for little girls, and even advisable for them to wear tight drawers, but it is probably best for young ladies and women to wear them open.

References

Undergarments